Michał is a Polish and Sorbian form of Michael and may refer to:
 Michał Bajor (born 1957), Polish actor and musician
 Michał Chylinski (born 1986), Polish basketball player
 Michał Drzymała (1857–1937), Polish rebel
 Michał Heller (born 1936), Polish academic and catholic priest
 Michał Kalecki (1899–1970), Polish economist
 Michał Kamiński (born 1972), Polish politician
 Michał Kubiak (born 1988), Polish volleyball player
 Michał Kwiatkowski (born 1990), Polish cyclist
 Michał Listkiewicz (born 1953), Polish football referee
 Michał Lorenc (born 1955), Polish film score compose
 Michał Łysejko (born 1990), Polish heavy metal drummer
 Michał Piróg (born 1979), Polish dancer, choreographer, TV presenter, actor and television personality
 Michał Gedeon Radziwiłł (1778–1850), Polish noble
 Michał Rozmys (born 1995), Polish middle-distance runner
 Michał Sołowow (born 1962), Polish billionaire businessman and rally driver
 Michał Sopoćko (1888–1975), the confessor of saint Faustina Kowalska and Apostle of Divine Mercy
 Michał Szpak (born 1990), Polish singer 
 Michał Winiarski (born 1983), Polish volleyball player and coach
 Michał Korybut Wiśniowiecki (1640–1673), King of Poland
 Michał Żebrowski (born 1972), Polish actor 
 Michał Żewłakow (born 1976), Polish footballer
 Michał Życzkowski (1930–2006), Polish technician
 Michał Rola-Żymierski (1890–1989), Polish communist leader and military commander

See also
Michel (disambiguation)
Michael

Polish masculine given names